Lawers  is a village situated in rural Perthshire, Scotland.  It lies on the banks of Loch Tay and at the foot of Ben Lawers. It was once part of a vibrant farming industry in the area.

The Lady of Lawers lived most of her adult life there, and is buried in the old village ruins.

References

Villages in Perth and Kinross